Tengen may refer to:
 Tengen (Go), the center point on a Go board, and the name of a Go competition in Japan
 Tengen, Germany, a city in Baden-Württemberg, Germany
 Tengen (company), a defunct video game publisher and developer
 Tengen (era), the Japanese era name for the years 978–983
 Tengen Toppa Gurren Lagann, a 2007 anime series by Gainax
 Tian yuan shu, in Japanese tengenjutsu, a method of algebra in Chinese and Japanese mathematics
 Tengenjutsu (fortune telling), a Japanese fortune telling method